Alfredo Brás (born 26 December 1968) is a Portuguese long-distance runner. He competed in the men's 10,000 metres at the 1996 Summer Olympics.

References

1968 births
Living people
Athletes (track and field) at the 1996 Summer Olympics
Portuguese male long-distance runners
Olympic athletes of Portugal
Place of birth missing (living people)